Sleeping Beauty is a 1973 novel by Ross Macdonald.

Plot
Private eye Lew Archer finds himself the confidant of a wealthy, violent family with a load of trouble on their hands - including an oil spill, a missing girl, a lethal dose of nembutal, a six figure ransom and a stranger afloat, face down, off a private beach.

Adaptation
KCRW adapted Sleeping Beauty for a radio play in 1996.

References

1973 American novels
Lew Archer (series)
Novels by Ross Macdonald
Alfred A. Knopf books
1973 Canadian novels